Simon Ifede Ogouma ( – 29 January 2023) was a Beninese politician. He was the foreign minister of Benin from 1980 to 1982.

Ogouma died on 29 January 2023, at the age of 89.

References

1930s births
Year of birth missing
2023 deaths
Foreign ministers of Benin
20th-century Beninese politicians
Place of birth missing